Vanja Radauš (29 April 1906, Vinkovci, Kingdom of Croatia-Slavonia – 24 April 1975) was a Croatian sculptor, painter and writer.

Life

After attending elementary and high school in his home town of Vinkovci, he studied sculpture at the Academy of Fine Arts, University of Zagreb from 1924 to 1930. During World War II he participated in the National Liberation movement. He was a professor at the Academy of Fine Arts from 1945 to 1969.

In 1975, he committed suicide. He is buried in the Mirogoj Cemetery in Zagreb.

Work 
His early pieces (up to 1943) show the obvious influence of Rodin and Bourdelle. After the war, he concentrated on several sculptural "cycles" including: Typhus (1956–59), Panopticum Croaticum (1959–61), Man and Limestone (1961–63) and Pillars of Croatian Culture (1969-75). His work ranges in size from medals to large monuments.

Available writings 
Spomenici Slavonije iz razdoblja xvi do xix stoljeca (Monuments of Slavonia in the Nineteenth Century), Yugoslavian Academy of Science and Arts (1973)
Slavonijo, zemljo plemenita (Slavonia, the Noble Land; poetry), Privlacica (1994) 
Budenje snova (Waking Dreams; poetry), Naklada Levak (2000)

References

External links 

Croatian Postal Service: Commemorative Stamp issue, with an appreciation of his work 

1906 births
1975 deaths
People from Vinkovci
People from the Kingdom of Croatia-Slavonia
Croatian male poets
20th-century Croatian poets
20th-century Croatian sculptors
20th-century male writers
Members of the Croatian Academy of Sciences and Arts
1975 suicides
Suicides in Yugoslavia
Burials at Mirogoj Cemetery